The  Chana Star 9 (长安之星9) is a microvan produced by Changan Automobile under the Chana sub-brand.

Overview
Originally called the Chana Star 4500 (长安星光4500),  the Chana microvan was renamed after the 2014 facelift and was sold as the Chana Star 9 within the Chana Star series lineup. The original Chana Star 4500 was released by Changan Automobile back in 2013. The Chana Star 9 microvan is powered by a 1.5 liter engine and the previous Chana Star 4500 was powered by a 1.3 liter engine. 

Prices for the Star 4500 ranges from 50,900 yuan to 58,800 yuan, while prices for the Star 9 ranges from 47,800 yuan to 56,000 yuan.

References

External links

Chana Star 4500|Chana Star 9
Vans
Microvans
Rear-wheel-drive vehicles
Cars of China
Cars introduced in 2013